Cheng Yu (141–220) was an advisor to the warlord Cao Cao during the late Han dynasty.

Cheng Yu or Chengyu may also refer to:

Chengyu (成語), a type of idiomatic expression in the Chinese language
Chengdu-Chongqing dialect or Cheng-Yu dialect
Cheng Yu (musician), Chinese pipa player based in England
Cheng Yu (table tennis) (born  1952), Chinese para table tennis player
Winnie Yu (born 1954), Hong Kong radio personality

See also
Zheng Yu (born 1996), Chinese badminton player